Duncan Orestes Algyure (August 13, 1853 in Cornwall Township, Canada West – May 4, 1925) was a Canadian politician and physician. He graduated in medicine from McGill University in 1873. He was a member of the historical Conservative Party of Canada between November 15, 1911 and October 6, 1917 representing the riding of Stormont in the House of Commons of Canada after being elected on September 21, 1911.

External links
 

1853 births
1925 deaths
Physicians from Ontario
Conservative Party of Canada (1867–1942) MPs
Members of the House of Commons of Canada from Ontario